The Oi Rio Pro 2016 was an event of the Association of Surfing Professionals for 2016 ASP World Tour.

This event was held from 10 to 21 May at Rio de Janeiro, (Rio de Janeiro, Brazil) and opposed by 36 surfers.

The tournament was won by John Florence (HAW), who beat Jack Freestone (AUS) in final.

Round 1

Round 2

Round 3

Round 4

Round 5

Quarter finals

Semi finals

Final

References

Rio Pro
2016 World Surf League
International sports competitions in Rio de Janeiro (city)
2016 in Brazilian sport
Sports competitions in Rio de Janeiro (city)
Surfing in Brazil